Events from the year 1988 in the United Arab Emirates.

Incumbents
President: Zayed bin Sultan Al Nahyan 
Prime Minister: Rashid bin Saeed Al Maktoum

Births

 28 March - Mohamed Al-Shehhi.
 1 July - Ismail Al Hammadi.

References

 
Years of the 20th century in the United Arab Emirates
United Arab Emirates
United Arab Emirates
1980s in the United Arab Emirates